Granada Lions is an American football team based in Granada, Andalusia, Spain.

History
The team was established February 2, 2001 as Granada Universitarios. The name was later changed to the actual Lions, after one of the better known symbols from the Alhambra, the Court of the Lions, in order to represent the whole city of Granada.

After playing in regional leagues, they joined the national league LNFA 2 in 2004.

Finally, in 2006, the team was promoted to the top league in Spain, the LNFA, where they keep competing.

Notable players
   Alvaro Carvajal, Quarterback

Notable former players 
   Brian Wilbur, Quarterback

References

External links 
Official website

American football teams in Spain
Sport in Granada
American football teams established in 2001
Sports teams in Andalusia